Hieronim is the Polish form of Hieronymus and may refer to:

Adam Hieronim Sieniawski (1576–1616) (1576–1616), Polish–Lithuanian noble
Adam Hieronim Sieniawski (1623–1650) (1623–1650), Polish noble
Dominik Hieronim Radziwiłł (1786–1813), Lithuanian nobleman
Hieronim Augustyn Lubomirski (1647–1706), Polish noble (szlachcic), magnate, politician and  military commander
Hieronim Barczak (born 1953), Polish footballer
Hieronim Chodkiewicz (1500–1561), Vilnius ciwun in 1542
Hieronim Czarnowski (1834–1902), Polish chess master and activist
Hieronim Dekutowski (1918–1949), a Polish boyscout and soldier, who fought in Polish September Campaign
Hieronim Florian Radziwiłł (1715–1760), Polish-Lithuanian szlachcic
Hieronim Jarosz Sieniawski (1516–1579), Polish noble
Hieronim Morsztyn (1581–1623), Polish poet
Hieronim Radziejowski (1612–1667), Polish szlachcic
Hieronim Wietor (ca. 1480–1546/47), printer in Vienna and Kraków
Hieronim Wincenty Radziwiłł (1759–1786), Polish-Lithuanian nobleman
Hieronim Wołłowicz of Bogorya Coat of Arms, born in 16th century, Lithuanian Podkanclerz and Grand Treasurer of Lithuania
Michał Hieronim Radziwiłł (1744–1831), Lithuanian noble, Knight of the Order of the White Eagle
Michał Hieronim Krasiński (1712–1784), Polish noble, cześnik of Stężyca, podkomorzy of Różan, starost of Opiniogóra
Mikołaj Hieronim Sieniawski (1645–1683), Polish noble (szlachcic), military leader, politician
Władysław Hieronim Sanguszko (1803–1870), Polish noble (szlachcic), conservative politician